

See also
 List of sovereign states
 List of Latin place names in Europe
 Names of European cities in different languages
 List of European regions with alternative names
 List of European rivers with alternative names

External links
Slovene Governmental Commission for the Standardisation of Geographical Names - in the first column are names as proposed by the commission, in the second column are short official names, in the third column are long official names. Accessed on 7 October 2005.

D–I